The Massacre (or Slaughter) of the Innocents is an incident in the nativity narrative of the Gospel of Matthew (2:16–18) in which Herod the Great, king of Judea, orders the execution of all male children who are two years old and under in the vicinity of Bethlehem. Christians venerate them as the first Christian martyrs. A majority of Herod biographers, and "probably a majority of [...] biblical scholars," hold the event to be myth or legend.

Biblical narrative
The Gospel of Matthew tells how the Magi visit Jerusalem to seek guidance as to where the king of the Jews has been born; King Herod directs them to Bethlehem and asks them to return to him and report, but they are warned in a dream that Herod wishes to find the child and kill him, and do not do so. Matthew continues:

This is followed by a reference to and quotation from the Book of Jeremiah (Jeremiah 31:15) (Jeremiah 31:14 in the Hebrew Bible): "Then what was said through the prophet Jeremiah was fulfilled: A voice is heard in Ramah, weeping and great mourning, Rachel weeping for her children and refusing to be comforted, because they are no more." (Matthew 2:17-18). The relevance of this to the massacre is not immediately apparent, as Jeremiah's next verses go on to speak of hope and restoration.

History and theology

The story of the massacre is found in no gospel other than Matthew, nor is it mentioned in the surviving works of Nicolaus of Damascus (who was a personal friend of Herod the Great), nor in Josephus's Antiquities of the Jews, despite his recording many of Herod's misdeeds including the murder of three of his own sons. The event is alluded to by Macrobius, a pagan writing in the early 5th century: "On hearing that the son of Herod, king of the Jews, had been slain when Herod ordered that all boys in Syria under the age of two be killed, [Augustus] said, 'It’s better to be Herod’s pig than his son.'" In view of the lack of independent confirmation that the event ever occurred, many scholars consider it folklore inspired by Herod's reputation. 

The author appears to have modeled the episode on the biblical story of Pharaoh's attempt to kill the Israelite children in the Book of Exodus, as told in an expanded version that was current in the 1st century. In that expanded story, Pharaoh kills the Hebrew children after his scribes warn him of the impending birth of the threat to his crown (i.e., Moses), but Moses' father and mother are warned in a dream that the child's life is in danger and act to save him. Later in life, after Moses has to flee, like Jesus, he returns when those who sought his death are themselves dead.

Numbers
The Greek liturgy asserts 14,000 Holy Innocents, while an early Syrian list of saints asserts 64,000. Coptic sources assert 144,000 and that it took place on 29 December. The Catholic Encyclopedia of 1907–12, recognising that Bethlehem was too small a town to provide such numbers, reduced the victims to between six and twenty children in the town, with a dozen or so more in the surrounding areas.

In Christian art
Medieval liturgical drama recounted Biblical events, including Herod's slaughter of the innocents. The Pageant of the Shearmen and Tailors, performed in Coventry, England, included a haunting song about the episode, now known as the Coventry Carol. The Ordo Rachelis tradition of four plays includes the Flight into Egypt, Herod's succession by Archelaus, the return from Egypt, as well as the Massacre all centered on Rachel weeping in fulfillment of Jeremiah's prophecy. These events were likewise in one of the medieval N-Town Plays.

The "Coventry Carol" is a Christmas carol dating from the 16th century. The carol was performed in Coventry in England as part of a mystery play called The Pageant of the Shearmen and Tailors. The play depicts the Christmas story from chapter two in the Gospel of Matthew. The carol refers to the Massacre of the Innocents, in which Herod ordered all male infants two years old and under in Bethlehem to be killed. The lyrics of this haunting carol represent a mother's lament for her doomed child. It is the only carol that has survived from this play. The author is unknown. The oldest known text was written down by Robert Croo in 1534, and the oldest known printing of the melody dates from 1591. The carol is traditionally sung a cappella.

The 17th Century Dutch Christmas song O Kerstnacht, schoner dan de dagen, while beginning with a reference to Christmas Night, is about the Massacre of the Innocents. The Dutch progressive rock band Focus recorded in 1974 the first two verses of the song for their album Hamburger Concerto.

The theme of the "Massacre of the Innocents" has provided artists of many nationalities with opportunities to compose complicated depictions of massed bodies in violent action. It was an alternative to the Flight into Egypt in cycles of the Life of the Virgin. It decreased in popularity in Gothic art, but revived in the larger works of the Renaissance, when artists took inspiration for their "Massacres" from Roman reliefs of the battle of the Lapiths and Centaurs to the extent that they showed the figures heroically nude. The horrific subject matter of the Massacre of the Innocents also provided a comparison of ancient brutalities with the brutalities of the early modern period, during the period of religious wars that followed the Reformation Bruegel's versions show the soldiers carrying banners with the Habsburg double-headed eagle.

The 1590 version by Cornelis van Haarlem also seems to reflect the violence of the Dutch Revolt. Guido Reni's early (1611) Massacre of the Innocents, in an unusual vertical format, is at Bologna. The Flemish painter Peter Paul Rubens painted the theme more than once. One version, now in Munich, was engraved and reproduced as a painting as far away as colonial Peru. Another, his grand Massacre of the Innocents is now at the Art Gallery of Ontario in Toronto, Ontario. The French painter Nicolas Poussin painted The Massacre of the Innocents (1634) at the height of the Thirty Years' War.

The Childermass, after a traditional name for the Feast of the Holy Innocents, is the opening novel of Wyndham Lewis's trilogy The Human Age. In the novel The Fall (La Chute) by Albert Camus, the incident is argued by the main character to be the reason why Jesus chose to let himself be crucified—as he escaped the punishment intended for him while many others died, he felt responsible and died in guilt. A similar interpretation is given in José Saramago's controversial The Gospel According to Jesus Christ, but there attributed to Joseph, Jesus' stepfather, rather than to Jesus himself. As depicted by Saramago, Joseph knew of Herod's intention to massacre the children of Bethlehem, but failed to warn the townspeople and chose only to save his own child. Guilt-ridden ever after, Joseph finally expiates his sin by letting himself be crucified (an event not narrated in the New Testament).

The song "Long Way Around The Sea", from the 1999 Christmas EP by the indie-rock band Low, tells the story from the perspective of the magi during their journey from Herod to the newborn Jesus, and the warning from the angel not to return.

The Massacre is the opening plot used in the 2006 film The Nativity Story (2016). It is also dramatized in season 1 of the television miniseries Jesus of Nazareth (1977).

The Cornish poet Charles Causley used the subject for his poem The Innocents' Song, which as a folk song has been performed by Show of Hands with music by Johnny Coppin (on their album Witness); and by Keith Kendrick and Sylvia Needham.

Paintings
 Massacre of the Innocents by the Bruegels. Several versions of The Massacre of the Innocents were painted by Pieter Bruegel the Elder (c. 1565–67) and his son Pieter Brueghel the Younger (into the 17th century).
 Massacre of the Innocents by Guido Reni, created in 1611 for the Basilica of San Domenico in Bologna, but now in the Pinacoteca Nazionale in that city
 Two versions by Peter Paul Rubens, painted in 1611–1612 and 1636–1638
 The Massacre of the Innocents by Nicolas Poussin, painted between 1625 and 1632
 Massacre of the Innocents by Matteo di Giovanni

Music
The communion motet for the feast of the holy innocents is the text from Matthew  2:18 (citing Jeremiah 31:15) Vox in Rama. This was set polyphonically by a number of composers of the renaissance and baroque, including Jacob Clemens non Papa, Giaches de Wert, Heinrich Schütz (in German). 

Marc-Antoine Charpentier composed an oratorio Caedes sanctorum innocentium, H.411, for soloists, chorus, 2 violins and continuo (1683–85).

Feast day

Dates by denomination
Today, the date of Holy Innocents' Day, also called the Feast of the Holy Innocents or Childermas or Children's Mass, varies.
 27 December for West Syrians (Syriac Orthodox Church, Syro-Malankara Catholic Church, and Maronite Church)
 * 28 December is the date in the Church of England (Festival), the Lutheran Church and the Roman Rite of the Catholic Church. In these Western Christian denominations, Childermas is the fourth day of Christmastide.
 29 December for the Eastern Orthodox Church.
 10 January for East Syrians (Chaldeans and Syro-Malabar Catholic Church).

Beginnings
The commemoration of the massacre of the Holy Innocents, traditionally regarded as the first Christian martyrs, if unknowingly so, first appears as a feast of the Western church in the Leonine Sacramentary, dating from about 485. The earliest commemorations were connected with the Feast of the Epiphany, 6 January: Prudentius mentions the Innocents in his hymn on the Epiphany. Leo in his homilies on the Epiphany speaks of the Innocents. Fulgentius of Ruspe (6th century) gives a homily De Epiphania, deque Innocentum nece et muneribus magorum ("On Epiphany, and on the murder of the Innocents and the gifts of the Magi").

Catholic medieval traditions
From the time of Charlemagne, Sicarius of Bethlehem was venerated at Brantôme, Dordogne as one of the purported victims of the Massacre.

In the Middle Ages, especially north of the Alps, the day was a festival of inversion involving role reversal between children and adults such as teachers and priests, with boy bishops presiding over some church services. Bonnie Blackburn and Leofranc Holford-Strevens suggest that this was a Christianized version of the Roman annual feast of the Saturnalia (when even slaves played "masters" for a day). In some regions, such as medieval England and France, it was said to be an unlucky day, when no new project should be started.

There was a medieval custom of refraining where possible from work on the day of the week on which the feast of "Innocents Day" had fallen for the whole of the following year until the next Innocents Day. Philippe de Commynes, the minister of King Louis XI of France tells in his memoirs how the king observed this custom, and describes the trepidation he felt when he had to inform the king of an emergency on the day.

Catholic contemporary traditions
In Spain, Hispanic America, and the Philippines, December 28 is still a day for pranks, equivalent to April Fool's Day in many countries. Pranks (bromas) are also known as inocentadas and their victims are called inocentes; alternatively, the pranksters are the "inocentes" and the victims should not be angry at them, since they could not have committed any sin. One of the more famous of these traditions is the annual "Els Enfarinats" festival of Ibi in Alacant, where the inocentadas dress up in full military dress and incite a flour fight.

In Trinidad and Tobago, Roman Catholic children have their toys blessed at a Mass.

Roman Rite before & after 1955
In the Roman Rite prior to 1955, a unique feature of this feast was the use of liturgical elements ordinarily ascribed to penitential days—including violet vestments, the omission of the Gloria, and the substitution of a Tract in place of the Alleluia—unless the feast fell on Sunday, in which case the rubrics required the feast to be celebrated as on its octave day, with red vestments, Gloria, and Alleluia. The octave of this feast was suppressed by Pope Pius XII in 1955, with the feast now celebrated using the features formerly ascribed to its octave day, a practice reinforced by the 1960 Code of Rubrics.

Gallery

See also
 Chapel of the Milk Grotto
 Church of the Nativity § Tombs
 Coventry Carol
 Flight into Egypt
 Jesus and Messianic prophecy § Jeremiah 31:15
 Star of Bethlehem

Notes

References

Citations

Sources

 
 
 
 
 
 
 

 
 
 
 

 

1st-century BC Christian saints
Ante-Nicene Christian martyrs
Bethlehem
Christian child saints
Christian iconography
Christian saints from the New Testament
Christmastide
December observances
Gospel of Matthew
Herod the Great
Incidents of violence against boys
Infanticide
 
Massacres in the Bible
Matthew 2
Nativity of Jesus in the New Testament
Saints days
Anglican saints